Steven Hill (born ) is an American former professional basketball player. A  center, he attended University of Arkansas.

College career
In his freshman year, Hill started 18 of 30 games for the Arkansas Razorbacks and finished second in the Southeastern Conference with 1.8 blocks per game, also averaging 2.3 points and rebounds. The number of blocks achieved, 54, was second most for a freshman in Arkansas history, the leader being Oliver Miller with 60.

In his second year, Hill upped his numbers slightly, averaging 2.8 blocks in the process, good enough for second in the conference. His 91 blocks as a sophomore surpassed Miller's record of 85.

Hill received SEC Defensive Player of the Year accolades in his junior year, and improved his averages once again (6.2 points, 4.4 rebounds and 2.8 blocks), while his 93 made shots and 218 total points doubled his career totals entering the year. In blocked shots, Hill's total of 99 made him the first Razorback to get 90+ blocks in more than one year. In his senior year, his numbers decreased slightly.

Professional career
After going undrafted in the 2008 NBA draft, Hill was signed by the Portland Trail Blazers in August 2008, but was waived in October, before the 2008–09 season began.

He was signed by the Oklahoma City Thunder on November 4, 2008, playing one game before being assigned to the Thunder's D-League affiliate Tulsa 66ers on November 21. On December 13, Hill was recalled by the Thunder, after averaging 9.6 points, 7.2 rebounds and 2.8 blocks in 25.6 minutes in five games for the 66ers. A week later, without playing an additional game, he was made expendable and subsequently waived by the Thunder to make room on their roster for newly signed 7'0" center Nenad Krstic.

He played with the Minnesota Timberwolves during the NBA 2009 Summer League and with the Sacramento Kings during the NBA 2010 Summer League.

In October 2010, Hill signed a training camp contract with the Portland Trail Blazers, but was waived prior to the regular season.

References

External links
 NBA.com profile

1985 births
Living people
American men's basketball players
Arkansas Razorbacks men's basketball players
Basketball players from Kansas
Centers (basketball)
Oklahoma City Thunder players
Power forwards (basketball)
People from Chanute, Kansas
Tulsa 66ers players
Undrafted National Basketball Association players